Paper Moon is an upcoming South Korean television series starring Kim Seo-hyung, Yoo Sun, Seo Young-hee, Lee Si-woo, Gong Jung-hwan, Lee Chun-hee, and Yoon Hee-seok. It is based on a novel of the same name by Mitsuyo Kakuta, which was previously made into a movie and TV series in Japan. The series is an original drama of Genie TV, and will be available for streaming on its platform, and on OTT media service TVING. It will also premiere on ENA on April 10, 2023, and will air every Monday and Tuesday at 22:00 (KST).

Synopsis
The series follows the story of Yoo Yi-hwa, a housewife with an indifferent husband. She then gets a job as a contract employee at a savings bank and gradually regains her confidence. However, her normal daily life becomes irreversibly twisted when she begins to embezzle the VIP customers' money.

Cast

Main
 Kim Seo-hyung as Yoo Yi-hwa: a woman in search of true happiness
 Yoo Sun as Ryu Ga-eul: Yi-hwa's friend who is the general manager of a beauty company
 Seo Young-hee as Kang Seon-young: Yi-hwa's friend who is a full-time housewife
 Lee Si-woo as Yoon Min-jae: a film major student
 Gong Jung-hwan as Choi Gi-hyeon: Yi-hwa's husband
 Lee Chun-hee as Seong Si-hun: Ga-eul's ex-husband who is a dermatologist
 Yoon Hee-seok as Je-guk: Seon-young's husband and Gi-hyeon's colleague

Supporting
 Yoo Ui-tae as Geum Seok-jin: Ga-eul's colleague
 Byun Seo-yoon as Lim Ga-deun: Min-jae's close college classmate

References

External links
  
 
 

Korean-language television shows
ENA television dramas
South Korean suspense television series
South Korean thriller television series
Television shows based on Japanese novels
2023 South Korean television series debuts

Upcoming television series